Zgornje Koseze is a village in the Municipality of Moravče in central Slovenia. The area is part of the traditional region of Upper Carniola. It is now included with the rest of the municipality in the Central Slovenia Statistical Region.

Geography

Church
The local church is dedicated to Saint Stephen and belongs to the Parish of Moravče. It was a Gothic building that was restyled in the Baroque in 1753.

References

External links

Zgornje Koseze on Geopedia

Populated places in the Municipality of Moravče